Saña District, also Zaña District, is one of twenty districts of the province Chiclayo in Peru. The town of Zaña is the capitol of the district.

References